Heidelberg Township is a township in York County, Pennsylvania, United States. The township was erected in 1750 and encompassed the land grant known as "Digges' Choice" (a warrant granted to John Digges in 1727 by the province of Maryland, prior to the time the Mason-Dixon line fixed the final boundary between Maryland and Pennsylvania). The township consisted of 9,030 acres and extended as far west as the borough (town) of McSherrystown. The township included the borough (town) of Hanover until Hanover was made a borough in 1815. When Adams County was formed from western York County in 1800, the portion of Heidelberg Township that was included in York County was subsequently renamed Conewago Township. In 1860, the western half of Heidelberg Township (including the area around Hanover) was split off to form Penn Township. Although residents of this township have a Hanover, PA address, the children attend Spring Grove School District.

The population of Heidelberg Township was 3,027 at the 2020 census.

Geography

Demographics
As of the census of 2000, there were 2,970 people, 1,082 households, and 871 families residing in the township.  The population density was 205.4 people per square mile (79.3/km2).  There were 1,104 housing units at an average density of 76.4/sq mi (29.5/km2).  The racial makeup of the township was 97.91% White, 0.47% African American, 0.30% Native American, 0.13% Asian, 0.07% Pacific Islander, 0.27% from other races, and 0.84% from two or more races. Hispanic or Latino of any race were 0.64% of the population.

There were 1,082 households, out of which 35.4% had children under the age of 18 living with them, 73.3% were married couples living together, 4.8% had a female householder with no husband present, and 19.5% were non-families. 15.2% of all households were made up of individuals, and 6.2% had someone living alone who was 65 years of age or older.  The average household size was 2.74 and the average family size was 3.06.

In the township the population was spread out, with 25.8% under the age of 18, 5.5% from 18 to 24, 30.8% from 25 to 44, 27.0% from 45 to 64, and 10.9% who were 65 years of age or older.  The median age was 39 years. For every 100 females, there were 102.5 males.  For every 100 females age 18 and over, there were 101.5 males.

The median income for a household in the township was $51,976, and the median income for a family was $56,763. Males had a median income of $38,429 versus $23,225 for females. The per capita income for the township was $23,506.  About 2.3% of families and 2.9% of the population were below the poverty line, including 3.2% of those under age 18 and 6.5% of those age 65 or over.

References

Populated places established in 1738
Townships in York County, Pennsylvania
Townships in Pennsylvania
1738 establishments in Pennsylvania